Michael McQuillan may refer to:
 Michael McQuillan (Gaelic footballer)
 Michael McQuillan (mathematician)